Stefanovo refers to the following places in Bulgaria:

 Stefanovo, Dobrich Province
 Stefanovo, Gabrovo Province
 Stefanovo, Lovech Province
 Stefanovo, Pernik Province